Julia Ledóchowska, USAHJ (17 April 1865 – 29 May 1939) - in religious Maria Ursula of Jesus - was a Polish Catholic nun and the foundress of the Ursulines of the Agonizing Heart of Jesus. Ledóchowska was a prolific supporter of Polish independence which she often spoke about at conferences across Scandinavia while she settled in Russia for a time to open convents until her expulsion. But she continued to found convents across Scandinavian countries and even translated a Finnish catechism for the faithful there while later founding her own order which she would later manage from Rome at the behest of Pope Benedict XV.

Her death caused a tremendous outpouring of grief across Europe in the places that she had lived in and had visited; before long there were calls for a sainthood process to launch which would open 15 October 1981 (titling her as a Servant of God) despite diocesan investigations happening decades prior. The confirmation of her heroic virtue allowed for her to be named as Venerable in 1983; Pope John Paul II beatified her in Poznań in 1983 and later canonized Ledóchowska in Saint Peter's Square in mid-2003.

Life
Julia Ledóchowska was born just after Easter on 17 April 1865 in Loosdorf into a prominent noble house as the fifth of ten children to Count Antoni Halka-Ledóchowski (03.08.1823-21.02.1885) and his second wife Countess Josephine Salis-Zizers (01.07.1831-14.07.1909; she was descended from Swiss aristocrats). Her half-siblings from her father's first marriage to Countess Seilers were Tymoteusz (1855-1890) and Kazimierz Ignacy (1857-1930) and Antoni Ignacy Józef (22.05.1856-17.01.1935). Her siblings were:
 Maria Theresa (29.04.1863-06.07.1922)
 Wlodimir (07.10.1866-13.02.1942)
 Maria (died aged five)
 Maria Józefa (16.10.1867-21.07.1879)
 Ernestina (07.01.1869-19.03.1950)
 Franciszka (30.05.1870-07.07.1953)
 Iganacy Kazimierz (05.08.1871-06.03.1945)
 Josefa (died after birth)
 Stanisław (died after birth)
The Cardinal Halka-Ledóchowski was her paternal uncle.

Due to financial reverses in 1874 all relocated to Sankt Poelten where she and her sister Maria Theresa attended a grammar school that the Sisters of Loreto were managing. In 1882 her father - who longed to return to his homeland knowing his end was near - acquired an estate in Lipnica Murowana near Tarnów and in 1883 moved there where her father died in 1885 due to smallpox; her sister Maria Theresia also contracted this but recovered from it. He died after having blessed her desire to become a nun. The siblings' cardinal uncle took care of them after this.

On 18 August 1886 she entered the novitiate of the Ursulines in Kraków. In 1887 she received the religious habit and was given the religious name of "Maria Ursula of Jesus"; she made her perpetual profession on 28 April 1889. In 1904 she was elected as the Mother Superior of the convent and remained in that position until 1907. In Kraków she opened a home for female college students and at that time it proved to be a new phenomenon. The nun often spent hours in Eucharistic Adoration. With a special blessing of Pope Pius X she went to Saint Petersburg in Russia where she worked to build up the Saint Catharine House which was a residence for Polish children and adolescents that were living there at the behest of its pastor Konstantin Budkiewicz. The nun was forced to wear civil clothes since because Roman Catholic institutions were illegal in the Russian Empire. Once the tsarist government oppression to the faith grew she moved to the Russian-controlled Finland where she translated songs and a catechism for the Finnish fishermen who were Protestants for the most part. The religious also set up a free clinic for ill people as well as for the fishermen and their families. But her apostolic zeal soon attracted undue attention for the Russians began to monitor her moves and decided that enough was enough. In 1914 she was expelled from the Russian Empire and sought refuge in neutral Sweden though still kept in touch with the religious who remained in Russia. While in Sweden she committed herself to ecumenism and to that end worked alongside the Lutheran archbishop Nathan Söderblom. In 1915 she set up the newspaper "Solglimtar". In 1916 she met the writer Ellen Key.

Ledóchowska settled in Stockholm and started a language school and a domestic science school for girls while there in 1917 published the book "Polonica" in three different languages. In Denmark in 1918 she founded an orphanage and a school of home economics in Aalborg. In 1920 she returned to Poland with 40 other nuns who had joined her in her mission and with permission from Rome changed her independent convent in Pniewy into the Ursulines of the Agonizing Heart of Jesus which she founded on 7 June 1920. It was in Poland that the apostolic nuncio Achille Ratti - future Pope Pius XI - encouraged and blessed her work. In 1928 she founded a religious center in Rome where she had been living for sometime after Pope Benedict XV had invited her to manage the order there at the beginning of that decade. In 1930 she sent 30 nuns to female Polish workers in France. Ledóchowska was a noted orator who often called for and defended the right for Polish independence; she spoke in various forums and often addressed national leaders and fellow nobles from time to time.

In mid-1939 she died in Rome in her convent at Via del Casaletto due to a carcinoma. The religious noticed that she had not come to the Vespers and so knocked on her door before finding her dead with a rosary in her hand. Her incorrupt remains were translated to the convent in Pniewy on 29 May 1989. In 2005 her order had 832 religious in 98 houses in countries such as Canada and the Philippines amongst others; it received papal approval on 4 June 1923.

Sainthood

The canonization process opened in the Diocese of Rome in an informative process that spanned from 16 March 1949 until 9 April 1957 once the investigations had been completed though two separate processes were held; one was held in Kraków from 23 June 1950 to 2 June 1951 while the other was held in Viviers from 13 May 1931 until 28 May 1951. Her writings were all collated and had to be investigated to determine that such writings adhered to official doctrine; the theologians who viewed them approved them on 12 July 1966. The formal introduction of the cause did not come until 15 October 1981 when she was titled as a Servant of God. The apostolic process was dispensed with so the findings of the investigation thus far were sent to Rome to the Congregation for the Causes of Saints who validated these processes on 10 December 1982. The C.C.S. and their consultants approved the Positio dossier on 18 January 1983 while the C.C.S. alone gave their independent approval on 29 March 1983. On 14 May 1983 she was named as Venerable after Pope John Paul II confirmed that she had lived a model Christian life of heroic virtue.

Ledóchowska's beatification depended on two miracles prior to the 1983 alterations and as such two cases - both in Kraków - were investigated. The first was investigated from 27 September 1971 until 17 February 1972 and the other was investigated from 16 April 1973 until 26 February 1974. These processes received C.C.S. validation on 10 December 1982 before a medical board of experts approved these miracles on 7 April 1983. Theologians likewise issued their approval on 17 May 1983 as did the C.C.S. on 7 June 1983. John Paul II granted the final authorization to it on 9 June 1983 and beatified the late nun while visiting Poznań on 20 June 1983.

One final miracle was needed for full sainthood and the case was investigated in Poland from 16 April 1998 until 26 June 1998 before receiving C.C.S. validation on 17 October 1998. The medical experts approved this case on 30 March 2000 as did the theologians on 1 February 2002 and the C.C.S. on 12 March 2002. John Paul II approved this - and the canonization - on 23 April 2002 while formalizing the date for the sainthood at a consistory of Rome-based cardinals on 7 March 2003. John Paul II canonized her in Saint Peter's Square on 18 May 2003 before a crowd of 50 000 people.

Miracles
The first miracle that led to her beatification involved the cure of Jan Kołodziejski on 26 March 1946 while the second miracle leading to beatification involved the cure of the nun (from Ledóchowska's own order) Magdalene Pawlak (in religious "Maria Danuta") on 16 April 1946. The decisive miracle that led to her canonization was the cure of Daniel Gajewski (b. 1982) who avoided electrocution in circumstances where he would otherwise have been killed had it not been for the late nun whom he saw moments before fading into unconsciousness on 2 August 1996.

Patronage
Since 2006 she has been the patron saint of Sieradz and since 2016 has been the patron of Pniewy. Ledóchowska is also the patron saint of Polish girls as well as orphans and educators.

See also

 Ursulines of the Agonizing Heart of Jesus
 Wlodimir Ledóchowski (her Jesuit brother)
 Maria Teresia Ledóchowska (her beatified sister)
 Mieczysław Halka Ledóchowski (her cardinal uncle)

References

External links
 Hagiography Circle
 Saints SQPN
 Holy See
 Faith ND
 Suore Orsoline S.C.G.A.
 Healing Grace
 The Sanctuary of Saint Ursula Ledóchowska
 Geni

1865 births
1939 deaths
19th-century Christian saints
19th-century Polish Roman Catholic nuns
19th-century venerated Christians
20th-century Christian saints
20th-century Polish Roman Catholic nuns
20th-century venerated Christians
Beatifications by Pope John Paul II
Burials in Poland
Canonizations by Pope John Paul II
Christian female saints of the Late Modern era
Founders of Catholic religious communities
Incorrupt saints
People from Melk District
Polish Austro-Hungarians
Ursula
Polish people of Austrian descent
Polish Roman Catholic saints
Ursulines
Venerated Catholics by Pope John Paul II
Deaths from cancer in Lazio